The Grove Hill Cemetery Chapel, in Grove Hill Cemetery near Shelbyville, Kentucky was built in 1893.  It was listed on the National Register of Historic Places in 1988.

It is a limestone ashlar building, designed and built by local builder Lynn T. Gruber in Gothic Revival style.

It is located south of Shelbyville at Clear Creek.

References

National Register of Historic Places in Shelby County, Kentucky
Gothic Revival architecture in Kentucky
Religious buildings and structures completed in 1895
1895 establishments in Kentucky
Limestone buildings in the United States
Chapels in the United States
Cemeteries on the National Register of Historic Places in Kentucky
Properties of religious function on the National Register of Historic Places in Kentucky